Malcolm Arthur Colston (5 April 1938 – 23 August 2003) was an Australian politician who served as a Senator for Queensland from 1975 to 1999. He was a member of the Labor Party until 1996, when he resigned to sit as an independent following a dispute over his candidacy for Deputy President of the Senate. Colston was a schoolteacher before entering politics, and held a doctorate in educational psychology from the University of Queensland.

Early life
Colston was born in Brisbane and joined the Labor Party at the age of 19 and held several branch positions in the party. He was unsuccessfully nominated for selection as a Senate candidate at the age of 23.

He qualified as a teacher and taught in several primary schools while he completed a doctorate in educational psychology at the University of Queensland. He failed on two further occasions to gain Senate selection. He later wrote a book, The Odd One Out, about his political experiences.

Political career

Role in 1975 constitutional crisis
Colston indirectly played a role in the 1975 Australian constitutional crisis.

On 30 June 1975, Queensland ALP Senator Bertie Milliner died suddenly. The Labor Party nominated Colston to fill the casual vacancy in the Senate. The Constitution provides that a Senate casual vacancy is filled by a person chosen by the relevant state parliament. Although not a constitutional requirement until 1977, it was long a convention for the state parliament to choose a person nominated by the departing Senator's political party. However, the Premier of Queensland, Joh Bjelke-Petersen, claimed that Colston was a "dangerous socialist" and refused to appoint him. Officially, though, Bjelke-Petersen expressed doubts over Colston's integrity and instead appointed Albert Field, a member of the Labor Party who was staunchly opposed to the policies of the Gough Whitlam Labor government.

The ALP challenged Field's appointment in the High Court, and Field was on leave from the Senate almost from the day of his appointment. That gave the Coalition a greater advantage and so was one of the crucial events that led to the dismissal of the Whitlam government.

Labor Senator
At the ensuing 1975 election, Colston was elected as a Labor senator. He continued to serve in that capacity until 1996.

From 1993 to his retirement, he was a joint Father of the Senate, along with Brian Harradine.

Resignation from Labor Party
After the 1996 election, the Labor Party refused to nominate Colston to become Deputy President of the Senate, a position he had previously held from 1990 to 1993. In a bid to win him over, the Howard Coalition government offered to support him. Colston resigned from the Labor Party by fax message at 11:30 a.m., on 20 August, and he took his seat as an independent that afternoon. In the evening, he was elected Deputy President, on the nomination of the Coalition. He opposed the Coalition's industrial relations package, but he voted for the sale of a third of Telstra and some other government initiatives. Colston then sat as a "Queensland First" senator.

Travel allowances scandal
In 1997, Colston was charged by the Commonwealth Director of Public Prosecutions with 28 charges of defrauding the Commonwealth by allegedly misusing his parliamentary travel allowance. He then revealed that he was suffering from cancer. Prosecution was not pursued after medical opinion was provided that Colston was unlikely to live long enough for a trial to be completed. In the event, he survived for a further six years. He retired from the Senate at the end of his term.

Death and estate
Colston died of colon cancer in 2003. He had appointed his wife, Dawn Colston, as executor and trustee of his will, but she died eleven months later, before she could dispose of her husband's will. She had appointed her brother, Brian McMullen, as executor of her will.

The Colstons' son, Douglas Colston, claimed that he was entitled to half the income of his parents' estates, and initiated action against McMullen. The case was ongoing, as of September 2011. As of 2022, the outcome of this case is unknown.

Notwithstanding the controversies that he generated after his defection from Labor, Colston requested that no condolence motion be moved in the Senate after his death.

References
Notes

Citations

Further reading

 

1938 births
2003 deaths
Australian Labor Party members of the Parliament of Australia
1975 Australian constitutional crisis
Members of the Australian Senate
Members of the Australian Senate for Queensland
University of Queensland alumni
Australian schoolteachers
Deaths from cancer in Queensland
Deaths from colorectal cancer
People educated at Brisbane State High School
Independent members of the Parliament of Australia
20th-century Australian politicians